Moreland Township, Pennsylvania is a township in Lycoming County.

Moreland Township may also refer to:
 Moreland Township, Philadelphia County, Pennsylvania, a defunct township that was located in Philadelphia County
 Moreland Township, Montgomery County, Pennsylvania, a defunct township that was located in Montgomery County

See also 
 Lower Moreland Township, Montgomery County, Pennsylvania
 Northmoreland Township, Wyoming County, Pennsylvania
 Upper Moreland Township, Montgomery County, Pennsylvania
 Westmoreland County, Pennsylvania